Akierra Mary Deanne Missick (born 1983) is a Turks and Caicos Islands lawyer and politician. She served as Deputy Premier and Minister of Education from 2012 to 2016 and Leader of Government Business and Minister of Infrastructure from 2021 to 2022 . A member of the Progressive National Party, Missick has served as the Member of Parliament (MP) for Leeward & Long Bay ED5 since 2012.

Law career
Missick was called to the bar of England and Wales and the bar of the Turks and Caicos Islands. She works as an associate for the law firm of Misick & Stanbrook, where she specialised in dispute resolution, company law, medical law, and personal injury law.

Political career
Missick became a member of the Progressive National Party in 2002. She was formerly Secretary-General of the PNP. She resigned from that position in August 2009 to protest statements made by Michael Misick, but continued her membership in the party.

In August 2012, Missick announced that she would be seeking the PNP's nomination to stand in Leeward District 5, Providenciales for the 2012 general election. Due to provisions in the new 2011 Constitution of the Turks and Caicos Islands, this required her to renounce any foreign allegiance she held by virtue of her own act. As Attorney-General Huw Shepheard commented, those who were merely born in foreign countries would not be affected by these changes, but those who had applied for foreign passports as adults would be. Missick, though the only U.S.-born candidate, was far from the only one to had to take quick action to renounce foreign citizenship; Bahamas-born People's Democratic Movement deputy leader Sharlene Cartwright-Robinson and several other members of her party were also affected, and the newly formed People's Progressive Party stood in danger of having all of its candidates disqualified. Missick renounced U.S. citizenship in mid-October, and was officially nominated on 25 October. She emerged victorious in the election, and the week afterwards was named as Deputy Premier and Minister of Education, Youth, Sports and Culture.

Missick was re-elected as the Member of Parliament for Leeward-Long Bay ED5 in the 2016 general election and the 2021 general election. She was appointed by Premier Charles Misick to serve as the Leader of Government Business and Minister of Infrastructure, Housing Planning and Development on 22 January 2021.

Personal life
Missick's mother is Doreen Missick, also a Turks and Caicos Islands politician, and a former member of the Advisory Council. Missick was born in the United States, and thus had jus soli citizenship there. She attended Ona Glinton Primary School on Grand Turk Island, Iris Stubbs Primary School on South Caicos, and MAST Academy in Miami, Florida in the United States. Following that she moved to England to continue her schooling, doing her A Levels at Notre Dame Catholic Sixth Form College, her LL.B at the University of Nottingham from 2002 to 2005, and her Bar Vocational Course at the Inns of Court School of Law in London.

References

1983 births
Living people
Alumni of the University of Nottingham
American emigrants to the Turks and Caicos Islands
Politicians from Miami
Government ministers of the Turks and Caicos Islands
Members of the Turks and Caicos Islands House of Assembly
Progressive National Party (Turks and Caicos Islands) politicians
Former United States citizens
Turks and Caicos Islands lawyers
Women government ministers of the Turks and Caicos Islands
21st-century American women politicians
21st-century American politicians
Education ministers